Hacıqurbanoba (also, Gadzhikurban-Oba and Gadzhykurbanoba) is a village in the Khachmaz Rayon of Azerbaijan.  The village forms part of the municipality of Qaraqurdlu.

References 

Populated places in Khachmaz District